In mathematics, the particular point topology (or included point topology) is a topology where  a set is open if it contains a particular point of the topological space.  Formally, let X be any non-empty set and p ∈ X.  The collection

of subsets of X is the particular point topology on X.  There are a variety of cases that are individually named:

 If X has two points, the particular point topology on X is the Sierpiński space.
 If X is finite (with at least 3 points), the topology on X is called the finite particular point topology.
 If X is countably infinite, the topology on X is called the countable particular point topology.
 If X is uncountable, the topology on X is called the uncountable particular point topology.

A generalization of the particular point topology is the closed extension topology.  In the case when X \ {p} has the discrete topology, the closed extension topology is the same as the particular point topology.

This topology is used to provide interesting examples and counterexamples.

Properties
 Closed sets have empty interior

Connectedness Properties
Path and locally connected but not arc connected

For any x, y ∈ X, the function f: [0, 1] → X given by
 

is a path.  However since p is open, the preimage of p under a continuous injection from [0,1] would be an open single point of [0,1], which is a contradiction.

Dispersion point, example of a set with
 p is a dispersion point for X.  That is X \ {p} is totally disconnected.

 Hyperconnected but not ultraconnected 
 Every non-empty open set contains p, and hence X is hyperconnected.  But if a and b are in X such that p, a, and b are three distinct points, then {a} and {b} are disjoint closed sets and thus X is not ultraconnected.  Note that if X is the Sierpiński space then no such a and b exist and X is in fact ultraconnected.

Compactness Properties
 Compact only if finite.  Lindelöf only if countable.
 If X is finite, it is compact; and if X is infinite, it is not compact, since the family of all open sets  forms an open cover with no finite subcover.

 For similar reasons, if X is countable, it is a Lindelöf space; and if X is uncountable, it is not Lindelöf.

 Closure of compact not compact
 The set {p}  is compact.  However its closure (the closure of a compact set) is the entire space X, and if X is infinite this is not compact.  For similar reasons if X is uncountable then we have an example where the closure of a compact set is not a Lindelöf space.

Pseudocompact but not weakly countably compact
 First there are no disjoint non-empty open sets (since all open sets contain p). Hence every continuous function to the real line must be constant, and hence bounded, proving that X is a pseudocompact space. Any set not containing p does not have a limit point thus if X if infinite it is not weakly countably compact.

 Locally compact but not locally relatively compact.
 If , then the set  is a compact neighborhood of x.  However the closure of this neighborhood is all of X, and hence if X is infinite, x does not have a closed compact neighborhood, and X is not locally relatively compact.

Limit related
 Accumulation points of sets
 If  does not contain p, Y has no accumulation point (because Y is closed in X and discrete in the subspace topology).

 If  contains p, every point  is an accumulation point of Y, since  (the smallest neighborhood of ) meets Y.  Y has no ω-accumulation point.  Note that p is never an accumulation point of any set, as it is isolated in X.

 Accumulation point as a set but not as a sequence
 Take a sequence  of distinct elements that also contains p.  The underlying set  has any  as an accumulation point. However the sequence itself has no accumulation point as a sequence, as the neighbourhood  of any y cannot contain infinitely many of the distinct .

Separation related

 T0
X is T0 (since {x, p} is open for each x) but satisfies no higher separation axioms (because all non-empty open sets must contain p).

 Not regular
Since every non-empty open set contains p, no closed set not containing p (such as X \ {p}) can be separated by neighbourhoods from {p}, and thus X is not regular. Since complete regularity implies regularity, X is not completely regular.

 Not normal
Since every non-empty open set contains p, no non-empty closed sets can be separated by neighbourhoods from each other, and thus X is not normal. Exception: the Sierpiński topology is normal, and even completely normal, since it contains no nontrivial separated sets.

Other properties

 Separability
 {p} is dense and hence X is a separable space.  However if X is uncountable then X \ {p} is not separable.  This is an example of a subspace of a separable space not being separable.

 Countability (first but not second)
 If X is uncountable then X is first countable but not second countable.

 Alexandrov-discrete
 The topology is an Alexandrov topology. The smallest neighbourhood of a point  is 

 Comparable (Homeomorphic topologies on the same set that are not comparable)
That is tq is the particular point topology on X with q being the distinguished point. Then (X,tp) and (X,tq) are homeomorphic incomparable topologies on the same set.

 No nonempty dense-in-itself subset
 Let S be a nonempty subset of X.  If S contains p, then p is isolated in S (since it is an isolated point of X).  If S does not contain p, any x in S is isolated in S.

 Not first category
 Any set containing p is dense in X.  Hence X is not a union of nowhere dense subsets.

 Subspaces
 Every subspace of a set given the particular point topology that doesn't contain the particular point, has the discrete topology.

See also 

 Alexandrov topology
 Excluded point topology
 Finite topological space
 List of topologies
 One-point compactification
 Overlapping interval topology

References

Topological spaces